The Crimson Circle is a service organization at Loyola Marymount University under Student Affairs in the office of The Center for Service and Action.

Mission
Service, honor, brotherhood, tradition, and faith are the hallmarks of the Crimson Circle. Dating back to 1929, the Circle has always had a tradition of prestigious and diverse membership. The Circle dedicates their time and expresses many outstanding talents that contribute to serving Loyola Marymount University and the greater Los Angeles and World communities in a commitment to social justice. To be a Crimson is to be a man for and with others.

History
The Crimson Circle was established at Loyola University in 1929 to assist the Jesuit Dean of Students with the enforcement of the Student Conduct Code at student assemblies and at athletic events. Appointed by the Student Council, they administered public punishment to those students found guilty of infraction of the laws and traditions of the University. It was composed of fifteen men from the sophomore, junior and senior classes. Father Lorenzo M. Malone, SJ, was the first moderator.

As Loyola University continued to develop and its needs changed, the purpose of Crimsom Circle also changed and developed. By the 1940s, Crimson Circle shed its responsibilities in enforcing the Student Conduct Code and became an honor society.

During the 1960s, Crimson Circle began to resemble the organization it is today. Crimson Circle became a service organization committed to the University to promote programs of the Associated Students of Loyola University, the President's Office, University Relations, and Admissions.

Today, Crimson Circle's mission is to serve at Loyola Marymount University and the surrounding communities of Los Angeles. Since its foundation, members of Crimson Circle have been recognized for leadership, loyalty, generous service, good academic standing, and high spirit.

The uniform colors of Crimson Circle remain crimson and grey, reflecting the old school colors of Loyola University. Crimson Circle is composed of 35 sophomore, junior, and senior men.

Moderators of Crimson Circle have included: Fr. Al Kilp, SJ; Fr. James Erps, SJ; and Fr. Wayne Negrete, SJ. Fr. Richard Robin, SJ. Its current moderator and chaplain is Fr. Sean Dempsey, SJ.

Crimson Circle remains an important part of the Jesuit history and tradition at Loyola Marymount University.

Present
In 2014 Crimson Circle has made a commitment to visit, tutor, and mentor students at St. Columbkille Catholic School and Urban Compass on a weekly basis. In the Spring of 2014, Crimson Circle was awarded the Riordan Community Action Grant to provide Urban Compass with an 8-week program focused on education of the whole person. Notable annual events served include the Down Syndrome Association of Los Angeles’ Buddy Walk, LMU’s Fright Night, and LMU’s Special Games. Crimson Circle continues to cultivate a growing presence at Midnight Mission to benefit the homeless population in Skid Row. In partnership with Belles service organization, Crimson Circle hosts the annual LMU Charity Ball which raises funds for their respective service placements. In addition, Crimson Circle has been a driving force of support for the successful biannual LMU Blood & Bone Marrow Drives done in conjunction with CSA and the UCLA Blood and Platelet Center.

Traditions & anniversaries
The Crimson Circle has had many traditions throughout its existence.  Most notably:
Catch That Bunny
LMU Magazine Highlights of Catch That Bunny 2014
Catch That Bunny 2011
Reunions
Slides from The Crimson Circle's 80th Reunion

Awards
 Riordan Empowerment Fund - The Riordan Foundation - November 2014 ($500 grant for Health/Fitness Fair at St. Columbkille School)
 Volunteer Honor Plaque - Buddy Walk at City Hall by DSA - October 2014
 Riordan Community Action Grant - The Riordan Foundation - February 2014 ($2,500 grant for programming at Urban Compass)
 See Crimson Blog for More Info: http://matthewsugidono.blogspot.com/2014_05_01_archive.html
 Volunteer Honor Plaque - Urban Compass - 2014

Additional Info
 https://web.archive.org/web/20150215043926/http://studentaffairs.lmu.edu/activitiesservice/centerforserviceaction/serviceopportunities/joinaservicegroup/serviceorganizations/crimsoncircle/

Loyola Marymount University